Maryland's Legislative District 10 is one of 47 districts in the state for the Maryland General Assembly. It covers part of Baltimore County.

Demographic characteristics
As of the 2020 United States census, the district had a population of 122,424, of whom 95,144 (77.7%) were of voting age. The racial makeup of the district was 30,566 (25.0%) White, 73,788 (60.3%) African American, 419 (0.3%) Native American, 5,694 (4.7%) Asian, 30 (0.0%) Pacific Islander, 5,023 (4.1%) from some other race, and 6,897 (5.6%) from two or more races. Hispanic or Latino of any race were 8,634 (7.1%) of the population.

The district had 83,265 registered voters as of October 17, 2020, of whom 12,553 (15.1%) were registered as unaffiliated, 10,415 (12.5%) were registered as Republicans, 59,162 (71.1%) were registered as Democrats, and 755 (0.9%) were registered to other parties.

Political representation
The district is represented for the 2023–2027 legislative term in the State Senate by Benjamin T. Brooks Sr. (D) and in the House of Delegates by Adrienne A. Jones (D), N. Scott Phillips (D) and Jennifer White (D).

References

Baltimore County, Maryland
10
10